Harvey L. Pitt (born February 28, 1945) is an American lawyer who served as the 26th chairman of the U.S. Securities and Exchange Commission (SEC), from 2001 to 2003.

History 
Pitt graduated from Stuyvesant High School in 1961. He graduated from Brooklyn College with a bachelor's degree in 1965, and from St. John's University School of Law with a JD degree in 1968. He later received the Presidential Medal of Distinction from Brooklyn College in 2003 and an honorary LLD from St. John's University School of Law.

From 1968 to 1978, Pitt served on the staff of the SEC, eventually becoming the agency's youngest general counsel in 1975 (at age 30). In between his two tenures at the SEC, Pitt was a senior partner at Fried, Frank, Harris, Shriver & Jacobson, where he represented clients such as: Lloyd's of London, the New York Stock Exchange, Fortune 500 corporations, and "virtually all the exchanges and investment houses." Pitt was later the chairman of the SEC, serving for eighteen months between 2001 and 2003 (rather than his full five-year term), before he resigned abruptly during a wave of criticism.

Notable accomplishments 
As the 26th Chairman of the SEC, Pitt, among other things, oversaw the SEC's response to the market disruptions resulting from the terrorist attacks of 9/11, for which he was lauded as a "voice of calm."
Further, Pitt was the "architect of the new rule requiring executives of large companies to personally certify their financial results."
Pitt created the SEC's "real time enforcement" program—a policy designed to make the SEC's enforcement initiatives more efficient and effective for the protection of investors and led the SEC's unanimous adoption of dozens of rules implementing the Sarbanes-Oxley Act of 2002.

Criticism and resignation

In July 2002, The New York Times wrote: "Democratic and Republican members of Congress joined administration officials today in ridiculing Harvey L. Pitt's request that his pay be increased and his job as chairman of the Securities and Exchange Commission be elevated to cabinet rank ... evoking an outpouring of bipartisan scorn." Pitt had tried to insert a provision into corporate antifraud legislation that would increase his pay by 21%, and also elevate his status to that of cabinet level, on a par with the secretary of state and attorney general, at a time when the stock markets had sunk to five-year lows and some congressional leaders were calling for him to resign. Tom Daschle, the Senate majority leader, who had previously called for Pitt to be dismissed, said: "Of all the things he has to think about, it is amazing to me that this is what he's spending his time thinking about. I think it makes our point, the point many of us had, that he is not qualified to serve in that position."

Pitt became the target of criticism when the Enron scandal broke out on his watch. Democrats alleged that he was too close to the accounting industry and that he subverted efforts to tighten regulation in the wake of the Enron scandal and other cases of corporate malfeasance. Pitt has also been blamed for not investigating millions of dollars made due to "put options" placed on United, and American Airlines just prior to Sept. 11, 2001. He also raised concerns when he met privately with former clients of his while they were subjects of SEC investigations.

Pitt resigned after attempting to appoint a board member (78-year-old William Webster) who chaired the audit committee of a company under SEC investigation for fraud and accounting irregularities, while it lacked internal controls, to head a commission overseeing the accounting industrywithout informing the White House or the other SEC Commissioners that Webster was under scrutiny for his involvement in a corporate accounting fraud investigation. Democratic Senator Paul Sarbanes, Chairman of the Senate Banking Committee, called for Pitt's resignation.  Republican Senators including Mike Enzi (Wyoming), the only accountant in the Senate, and Richard Shelby (Alabama) joined John McCain in criticizing Pitt. The U.S. Chamber of Commerce withdrew its support of Pitt.  A GAO report later  criticized Pitt for his lack of diligence in the decision to name Webster to head the Public Company Accounting Oversight Board, while also finding that while Pitt was aware of the Webster fraud investigation he was not aware of certain details.

Upon his resignation from the SEC in November 2002 after what the New York Times called "a political firestorm over his selection of the head of a new board overseeing the accounting profession", which led to four investigations of his actions, CFO Magazine wrote: "Harvey Pitt may be gone, but what he left undone can’t be forgotten. The perpetually embattled chairman of the Securities and Exchange Commission resigned on Election Night after 15 tumultuous months in office. Criticized for being too close to his former Wall Street clients, unable to build consensus, and arrogant to boot, he finally succumbed to criticism over his selection of William Webster to head the Public Company Accounting Oversight Board.""Hello, I Must Be Going," CFO.

Pitt was just the second SEC Chairman to resign abruptly as a result of political turmoil. Slate magazine wrote: "Of all Pitt’s transgressions, none has been more pathetic than his self-pitying denunciations of 'guilt by occupation.' ... He accepted seedy clients not out of principle, but because he wanted to be a player, and because he wanted the money and publicity such assignments generated." In November 2002 journalist Calvin Trillin wrote a ballad about him, based on Sondheim's "Demon Barber," that began "Attend the tale of Harvey Pitt, Who many thought was quite unfit".

When Pitt was asked in 2005 if he believed he could have left the SEC on a better note if he had stayed longer, he replied: "I feel I left on a very high note."

Other

Pitt received an honorary LL.D. degree from St. John's University School of Law in 2002, and received the President's Medal of Distinction from the President of Brooklyn College in 2003. He is a columnist with Compliance Week.

He is now the chief executive officer of the strategic consulting firm, Kalorama Partners, LLC.

References

External links
 Kalorama Partners website
 Harvey Pitt's Compliance Week column
 PBS Frontline: Bigger Than Enron
 PBS Frontline: A Tale of Two Chairmen
 

1940s births
American lawyers
Living people
Members of the U.S. Securities and Exchange Commission
Stuyvesant High School alumni
Brooklyn College alumni
St. John's University School of Law alumni
George W. Bush administration personnel
Lawyers from Brooklyn